Nosko, a surname of Slavic origin. It occurs in the descriptions of the Ukrainian lands of the 16th century as well as in the Cossack Registry of the year 1649. The surname may refer to:

Ernő Noskó (1945), Hungarian footballer
Hryhoriy Nosko (1910–1980), Ukrainian Soviet footballer
Ján Nosko (1988), Slovak footballer
Andrej Nosko (1981), Slovak political scientist

References

See also
 

Ukrainian-language surnames